La Mama Theatre is a not-for-profit theatre in Carlton, Victoria.  It has been nationally and internationally acknowledged as a crucible for cutting edge, contemporary theatre since 1967. La Mama produces work by theatre makers of all backgrounds and encouraging works that deconstruct and critique form, content and social issues.

History
The theatre, an initiative of founder Betty Burstall, was inspired by the "off-off-Broadway" theatre scene in New York City. Betty and her husband, film maker Tim Burstall, had just returned from a trip to New York and wanted to re-create the vibrancy and immediacy of the small theatres there. La Mama was modelled after the similarly named New York venue La MaMa Experimental Theatre Club."I got the idea for La Mama when we went to New York in the sixties. We were poor. It was impossible to go to the theatre – even to see a film was expensive – but there were these places where you paid fifty cents for a cup of coffee and you saw a performance, and if you felt like it you put some money in a hat for the actors. I saw some awful stuff and some good stuff. It was very immediate and exciting and when I came back to Melbourne I wanted to keep going, but there didn't exist such a place. So I talked around a bit, to a few actors and writers and directors, sounding them out about doing their own stuff, Australian stuff, for nothing ... I decided on Carlton because in 1967 it was a lively, tatty area with an Italian atmosphere and plenty of students ..." (Betty Burstall)

At a time when the production of Australian plays was almost non-existent (and financially risky), La Mama's non-for-profit organisation provided the venue for the performance of new experimental Australian theatre works. The first play performed at La Mama was a work by a new Australian writer Jack Hibberd, entitled Three Old Friends (1967), whose most successful play Dimboola opened there in 1969. The production of Australian works at La Mama soon became a staple, and within the first two years of its life twenty-five new Australian plays had premiered there.

La Mama also nurtured new works by composers, poets, and filmmakers. The opening of the alternative theatre provided a home base for many important figures in theatre and film including Hibberd and Alex Buzo. It was also regularly used by underground performance troupe Tribe (who later collaborated with Spectrum). The theatre's house troupe, the La Mama Group, established by actor-director Graeme Blundell evolved into the Australian Performing Group. La Mama's list of alumni includes notable Australian theatre artists such as David Williamson, Cate Blanchett, Jack Hibberd, Graeme Blundell, Judith Lucy and Julia Zemiro.

Current
La Mama Theatre operates today under the direction of Liz Jones, who took over the theatre as its artistic director in 1976.

La Mama's model of giving artists upfront funding to present work in a rent-free venue, with 80% box-office return, is unique in Australia. This model supports a high artistic risk/low financial risk proposition for artists and encourages a high volume of activity. In addition access to rehearsal and meeting space, administrative, marketing and technical support and ticketing reduces the barriers posed by a lack of money or infrastructure for artists.

In recent years, La Mama artists such as The Rabble, Daniel Schlusser and Nicola Gunn have gone on to perform at the Melbourne International Festival and Melbourne Theatre Company's NEON Festival of Independent Theatre. La Mama veteran Jack Charles continues to work across the country, and in 2013 La Mama regular Ben Grant was touring internationally with Robert Lapage.

Venues
La Mama operates out of two buildings: the original La Mama Theatre on Faraday Street, and the La Mama Courthouse a block away on Drummond Street.

The simple two-storey brick building housing the La Mama Theatre was built originally as a printing works for AR Ford in 1883. After serving various industrial purposes it was leased in 1967 for use as a small theatre to nurture new Australian drama. Designed by Carlton architect George S Clarke, it faced a right-of-way off University Street, which is south of and parallel to Faraday Street. The land in front of the Theatre is currently used as a forecourt for the community.

Fire damage and reconstruction

On 19 May 2018, La Mama was largely destroyed by fire. It was rebuilt, and reopened to the public on 9 December 2021, with the existing theatre building being restored and with a new structure to the front. The size of the performance space is the same, along with its original features (the internal staircase, the trapdoor and the fireplace). The administration team will be separately housed.

References

Further reading
Jones, Liz with Betty Burstall and Helen Garner, La Mama: History of a Theatre (Penguin Books Australia, 1988)
Robertson, Tim, The Pram Factory: The Australian Performing Group Recollected (Melbourne University Press, 2001)

External links

Theatres in Melbourne
Organisations based in Melbourne
Buildings and structures in the City of Melbourne (LGA)
1967 establishments in Australia
Heritage-listed buildings in Melbourne
Buildings and structures completed in 1883